Jerry Bergonzi (born October 21, 1947) is an American jazz tenor saxophonist, composer, and educator.

Early life and education 
Bergonzi received a B.A.  in Music Education from the University of Massachusetts Lowell in 1971 and is the founder of Not Fat Records.

Career
Bergonzi first gained recognition as he became a frequent guest-artist on several Dave Brubeck ensemble tours and recordings during the 1970s, and he held the saxophone chair in the Dave Brubeck quartet from 1979 - 1982. He recorded nine albums with Brubeck, from 1973 to 1981.

Bergonzi teaches at the New England Conservatory of Music in Boston.

He is the author of Inside Improvisation, a multi-volume series of instructional books with play-along CDs and videos, and another series of books about improvisation published by Advance Music. He is also the author of the book/CD set Sound Advice, published by Jamey Aebersold Jazz.

He has recorded on the Blue Note, Red, Not Fat, Concord, Atlantic, Label Bleu, Enja, Columbia, Deux Z, Denon, Canyon, Cadence, Musidisc, Ram, Ninety One, Freelance and Savant recording labels.  He has recorded extensively for Double-Time Records.

Discography

Miscellaneous 
Bergonzi is also a professional level pianist and bass guitarist.

He plays a mouthpiece by Aaron Drake (Drake "Jerry Bergonzi" Signature Mouthpiece).

Jeff Ellwood compiled and engraved nearly 200 of Bergonzi's original tunes. Bergonzi decided to give the compiled PDF books away for free.

Gallery

References

External links
 Official Website
 [ Allmusic]
 

1947 births
Living people
Musicians from Boston
American jazz tenor saxophonists
American male saxophonists
New England Conservatory faculty
Enja Records artists
SteepleChase Records artists
Red Records artists
HighNote Records artists
Label Bleu artists
21st-century American saxophonists
Jazz musicians from Massachusetts
21st-century American male musicians
American male jazz musicians
Double-Time Records artists
American jazz educators